William, Willie, Bill or Billy Miles may refer to:

Politicians
 William Miles (Queensland politician) (1817–1887), Australian politician
 Sir William Miles, 1st Baronet (1797–1878), English politician and agriculturalist
 William Porcher Miles (1822–1899), American politician

Others
 William Augustus Miles (1750s–1817), English political writer
 William Ernest Miles (1869–1947), English surgeon
 William H. Miles (1828–1892), American bishop
 William John Miles (1871–1942), Australian businessman and political activist
 Willie Miles, American baseball player
 Bill Miles (1931–2013), American filmmaker
 Billy Miles (fighter), a team member in the TV series The Ultimate Fighter: Team Hughes vs. Team Serra
 Billy Miles (The X-Files), a minor character in several episodes of The X-Files

See also
 Miles (surname)